Jericho Farm is a historic home located near Kingsville, Baltimore County, Maryland, United States near historic Jerusalem Mill Village. It is a large -story gable-roofed stone dwelling overlooking the Little Gunpowder Falls. The house was constructed in two periods: the original dwelling, built about 1780, was a -story, side-passage, double pile house; about 1820, a five-bay, -story, center-passage, single pile house was constructed against the south gable of the earlier building.

Jericho Farm was listed on the National Register of Historic Places in 1984.

References

External links
, including photo from 2004, at Maryland Historical Trust

Houses in Baltimore County, Maryland
Houses on the National Register of Historic Places in Maryland
Houses completed in 1780
National Register of Historic Places in Baltimore County, Maryland